Eleri (the Welsh form of the masculine given name Hilarus or Hilarius) may refer to:

 Pope Hilarius (5th century) in Welsh contexts
 Eleri, daughter of Brychan Brycheiniog, the Welsh, 5th-century king
 Saint Eleri (7th century), Welsh prince and abbot, cousin of Saint Winifred
 Eleri Cousins (born 1987), archaeologist and Lecturer in Roman History at the University of Lancaster 
 Eleri Earnshaw (born 1985), Welsh footballer
 Eleri Mills (born 1955), Welsh painter
 Eleri Morgan (comedian), Welsh comedian and actress 
 Eleri Rees (née Morgan; born 1953), Welsh judge
 Eleri Siôn (born 1971), Welsh radio and television host
 Sian Eleri, Welsh radio presenter

See also
 West Eleri, a village in Kerala in India

Welsh feminine given names